Yves may refer to:

 Yves, Charente-Maritime, a commune of the Charente-Maritime department in France
 Yves (given name), including a list of people with the name
 Yves (single album), a single album by Loona
 Yves (film), a 2019 French film

See also 

 Yves Tumor, U.S. musician
 
 Eve (disambiguation)
 Evette (disambiguation)
 Yvette (disambiguation)
 Yvon (disambiguation)
 Yvonne (disambiguation)